In Greek mythology, Panthous, son of Othrys, was an elder of Troy, husband of the "queenly" Phrontis and father of Euphorbus, Polydamas and Hyperenor.

Mythology 
Panthous was originally a priest of Apollo at Delphi. When Priam, after Troy had been destroyed by Heracles, sent a son of Antenor to Delphi to inquire whether it was appropriate to build a new citadel on the foundations of the destroyed city, said son of Antenor was charmed by Panthous' beauty and carried him off. Panthous, in accord with Priam' s will, continued to perform his duties as a priest of Apollo at Troy.

Panthous was credited with killing four Greeks in the Trojan War. In the Aeneid, Panthous is portrayed lamenting his own and Troy's fate on the night of the city's fall, with his baby grandson in his arms. He is further killed by one of the Greeks.

Notes

References 

 Gaius Julius Hyginus, Fabulae from The Myths of Hyginus translated and edited by Mary Grant. University of Kansas Publications in Humanistic Studies. Online version at the Topos Text Project.
 Homer, The Iliad with an English Translation by A.T. Murray, Ph.D. in two volumes. Cambridge, MA., Harvard University Press; London, William Heinemann, Ltd. 1924. . Online version at the Perseus Digital Library.
 Homer, Homeri Opera in five volumes. Oxford, Oxford University Press. 1920. . Greek text available at the Perseus Digital Library.
 Maurus Servius Honoratus, In Vergilii carmina comentarii. Servii Grammatici qui feruntur in Vergilii carmina commentarii; recensuerunt Georgius Thilo et Hermannus Hagen. Georgius Thilo. Leipzig. B. G. Teubner. 1881. Online version at the Perseus Digital Library.
 Publius Vergilius Maro, Aeneid. Theodore C. Williams. trans. Boston. Houghton Mifflin Co. 1910. Online version at the Perseus Digital Library.
 Publius Vergilius Maro, Bucolics, Aeneid, and Georgics. J. B. Greenough. Boston. Ginn & Co. 1900. Latin text available at the Perseus Digital Library.

Trojans
Characters in the Aeneid